Gil Wala also spell as Gill Wala is a small village located east of Kale Wala and east of Banka Cheema, Wazirabad Tehsil, Gujranwala District, Punjab, Pakistan. For education in the village a Government Elementary School (GES), Gill Wlala and Government Girls Elementary School (GGES), Gill Wala is functional, by Government of Punjab, Pakistan under Board of Intermediate and Secondary Education, Gujranwala.

See also 
 Saide Wali
 Gurali (Pakistan)
 Iftikhar Nagar Cheema

References 

Villages in Gujranwala District